Balachandra Menon (born 11 January 1954) is an Indian actor, director and script writer. He made a number of films in the 1980s and 1990s. He has directed 40 films and has acted in over 100. He won two National Film Awards including the National Film Award for Best Actor for his performance as station master Ismail the 1998 film Samaantharangal, which was also directed by him. He has also worked as a distributor, editor, composer, singer and producer in the Malayalam film industry. He has found space in the Limca Book of Records for the maximum number of films directed, scripted and acted in.

Menon has introduced many actors into the Malayalam Cinema Industry. Actors who made their debut in his films include Shobana in April 18, Parvathy in Vivahithare Ithile, Maniyanpilla Raju in Maniyan Pilla Adhava Maniyan Pilla, Karthika in Manicheppu Thurannappol, Annie in Ammayane Sathyam, and Nandini in April 19.

Personal life
Balachandra Menon was born in Kollam in 1954 to Shivashankara Pillai and Lalitha Devi. By virtue of his father being a railway station master, he served at Edava railway station and Menon had his formative years of childhood and adolescence life in this village. He studied at Edava Muslim High School, and has narrated nostalgically about his fond memories of his life in Edava in his autobiography Ammayaane Sathyam. He is an alumnus of University College Trivandrum, Fatima Mata National College, Kollam and Kerala Law Academy Law College, Thiruvananthapuram. Sisters: Sushma and Prema. Wife: Varada B. Menon. Children: Akhil Vinayak Menon, Bhavana B. Menon. Menon enrolled as a lawyer on 29 July 2012, 22 years after completing his degree. In 1997, he won the Karshakashree Award for farming from the Government of Kerala.

During his early days in Madras, he worked for the film weekly Nana as a correspondent. He has completed a diploma in journalism from Press Club, Trivandrum.

Literary works
  Achuvettante Veedu
  Mugam Abhimugam
  Samaantharangal
  18 April 19 April
  Ninnay Enthinu Kollaam ?
  Kaanatha Sulthanu Snehapoorvam
  Ammayanay Sathyam
 Ariyathathu, Ariyendathu
 Balachandramenonte 12 cherukathakal
 His book Ithirineram Othirikaryam recently released by veteran actor Madhu by handing over a copy to lyricist Sreekumaran Thampi.

Awards
Civilian Awards:
 2007 – Padma Shri

National Film Awards:
 1997 – Best Actor – Samaantharangal
 1997 – Best Film on Family Welfare –  Samaantharangal

Kerala State Film Awards:
 1979 – Best Screen Play – Uthrada Rathri
 1997 – Special Jury Award – Samaantharangal

Filmfare Awards South:
 1983 – Best Director – Karyam Nissaram
 1998 – Best Actor – Samaantharangal

Others:
 2018 - Limca Book of Records - Filmmaker who is credited as actor, director and writer in the most number of feature films

Filmography

Television
Suryodayam (Doordarshan, Direction)
Vilakku vekkum neram (Doordarshan)
Megham (Asianet)
Malayogam (Asianet)
Nizhalukal (Asianet)
Shamanathalam

As a singer
 Aanakoduthaalum ... 	Oru Painkilikkadha (1984)	
 Kochu Chakkarachi Pettu ... 	Ente Ammu Ninte Thulasi Avarude Chakki (1985)	
 Kaattinum Thaalam ... 	Njangalude Kochu Doctor	(1989)
 Choodulla kaattil ... 	Krishnaa Gopaalakrishnaa (2002)

References

External links
 Balachandra Menon official website
 Balachandra Menon at MSI
 
 malayalachalachithram.com

1954 births
Living people
Malayalam film directors
Male actors from Thiruvananthapuram
Male actors from Kollam
Recipients of the Padma Shri in arts
Kerala State Film Award winners
Malayalam screenwriters
Male actors in Malayalam cinema
Filmfare Awards South winners
Best Actor National Film Award winners
Film directors from Thiruvananthapuram
20th-century Indian film directors
21st-century Indian film directors
20th-century Indian male actors
21st-century Indian male actors
Malayalam film producers
Film producers from Thiruvananthapuram
20th-century Indian dramatists and playwrights
21st-century Indian dramatists and playwrights
Indian male film actors
Screenwriters from Thiruvananthapuram
Producers who won the Best Film on Family Welfare National Film Award
Directors who won the Best Film on Family Welfare National Film Award